KIJN 1060 is an AM radio station  broadcasting a religious format. It is licensed to Farwell, Texas, United States, and serves the Clovis area. The station is owned by Unido para Cristo, Inc.

1060 AM is a United States and Mexican clear-channel frequency; KYW and XEEP share Class A status.  KIJN must leave the air between sunset and sunrise in order to protect the nighttime skywave signal of those Class A stations.

External links

IJN (AM)
IJN
Parmer County, Texas